Waithali  located in today's northern Rakhine State, Myanmar, was the capital of the Waithali Kingdom from 788 to 1018. Like much of northern Rakhine State, Waithali is in a hilly locale. Like its predecessor, Dhanyawadi, the former capital site has fallen into ruin and much of it is now deserted. Only a few temples and traces of the old city wall remain. The site is about an hour's bus ride from Mrauk U.

Etymology
Waithali is the Burmese language pronunciation of the Pali word Vesali.

History
It has been estimated that the centre of power of the Arakanese world shifted from Dhanyawadi to Waithali in the 4th century AD as Dhanyawaddy Dynasty ended in 327 AD Although it was established later than Dhanyawadi, Waithali is the most Indianized of the four Arakanese kingdoms to emerge. Like all of the Arakanese Kingdoms to emerge, the Kingdom of Waithali was based on trade between the East (Pyu city-states, China, the Mons), and the West (India, Bengal, and Persia). The kingdom flourished off of China-India maritime routes. Waithali was a famed trade port with thousands of ships coming annually at its height. The city was built on the banks of a tidal creek and was enclosed by brick walls. The layout of the city had significant Hindu and Indian influence.

According to the Anandachandra Inscription, carved in 729 AD, the subjects of the Waithali Kingdom practiced Mahayana Buddhism, and proclaims that the ruling dynasty of the kingdom were descendants of the Hindu god, Shiva. Dr. E. H. Johnston's analysis reveals a list of kings which he considered reliable beginning from Chandra dynasty. The western face inscription has 72 lines of text recorded in 51 verses describing the Anandachandra's ancestral rulers. Each face recorded the name and ruling period of each king who were believed to have ruled over the land before Anandachandra  The Sanskrit text of the inscription remains unique in Myanmar, as Sanskrit was not widely used outside Arakan. The inscription further alludes to political connections with Sri Lanka and Andhra in regard to religious connections.

Some important and badly damaged life-size Buddha images were recovered from Letkhat-Taung, a hill east of the old palace compound. These statues are invaluable in helping to understand the Waithalian architecture, and also the extent of Hindu influence in the kingdom.

According to local legend, Shwe-taung-gyi, a hill north-east of the palace compound may be a burial place of a 10th-century Pyu king.

The rulers of the Waithali Kingdom were of the Chandra dynasty, so called because of their usage of the god Chandra on Waithali coins. The Waithali period is seen by many as the beginning of Arakanese coinage - which was almost a millennium earlier than that of the Burmese. On the reverse of the coins, the Srivatsa, while the obverse bears a bull, the emblem of the Chandra dynasty, under which the name of the King is inscribed in Sanskrit. The motifs used were in the Brahmanical traditional and included the bell, votive flowers, the trishula among others. The art style of the coins have many parallels to the Gupta art style. Motifs found on the coins were also found throughout late 1st millennium coins from nearby neighbors, including in Chittagong, Dvaravati and Champa. 

The Kingdom eventually declined in the 10th century, with Rakhine's political core moving to the Le-mro valley states at the same time as the rise of the Bagan Kingdom in central Myanmar. Some historians conclude that the decline was from a takeover or from the immigration of the Mranma (Bamar people) in the 10th century.

See also
Rakhine State
Dhanyawadi
Mrauk U

References

External sources
The Land of the Great Image - Being Experiences of Friar Manrique in Arakan by Maurice Collis

Populated places in Rakhine State
Former countries in Burmese history
Archaeological sites in Myanmar